The 2004 South African Figure Skating Championships was held in Cape Town. Skaters competed in the disciplines of men's and ladies' singles at the senior, novice, and pre-novice levels. There was also a junior and juvenile ladies' competition.

Senior results

Men

Ladies

External links
 Results

South African Figure Skating Championships, 2004
South African Figure Skating Championships